Carlos Alocén Arrondo (born 30 December 2000) is a Spanish professional basketball player for Real Madrid of the Liga ACB and the EuroLeague. He plays the point guard position.

Early life and career
Alocén grew up playing basketball at the youth level for Zaragoza. He made his professional debut on 30 October 2016, playing for Zaragoza in a Liga ACB game against Real Madrid. At age 15 years and 10 months, Alocén became the youngest ACB debutant in club history, breaking Sergi García's record. He also became the third-youngest player in Liga ACB history, behind Ángel Rebolo and Ricky Rubio. At the end of the 2018-19 ACB season, Alocén signed with Real Madrid, but remained on loan at Zaragoza for one season. Alocén was named the Best Young Player of the 2019–20 Basketball Champions League.

On 15 July 2020, he joined Real Madrid for the following season.

National team career
Playing with the Spanish team, Alocén won gold at the 2016 FIBA U16 European Championship, averaging 9.9 points, 6.4 assists (tournament leader), 2 steals and 2.3 rebounds. Earlier that year he had also played at the 2016 FIBA Under-17 World Championship in his hometown Zaragoza, finishing fourth. In February 2019, Alocén made his first appearance for the Spain men's national basketball team.

References

External links 
 Liga ACB profile

2000 births
Living people
Basket Zaragoza players
Liga ACB players
Point guards
Real Madrid Baloncesto players
Spanish men's basketball players
Sportspeople from Zaragoza